Kalateh-ye Seyyeda (also Romanized as Kalāteh-ye Seyyedā; also known as Kalāteh-ye Seyyed and Amīrābād) is a village in Abravan Rural District, Razaviyeh District, Mashhad County, Razavi Khorasan Province, Iran. At the 2006 census, its population was 361, in 81 families.

References 

Populated places in Mashhad County